is the name and titular superhero of a tokusatsu SF/superhero/kaiju/Kyodai Hero TV series.  Created by Tetsu Kariya, the show was produced by Toho Company Ltd., and aired on Fuji TV from May 7 to December 24, 1979, with a total of 31 half-hour episodes.  Starting with Episode 14, the show's title became Flaming Superman Megaloman (炎の超人メガロマン - Honô no Chôjin Megaroman).

Like Toho's Meteor Man Zone, the series mixes elements of the Kyodai Hero genre with those of the Sentai Series (Battle Fever J, the first "Super Sentai", had premiered on TV around the same time).  This series features a superhero quintet similar to those seen in the Super Sentai Series, but just like in Zone Fighter, the team's leader/main character Takashi Shishidou transforms into a giant long-haired Ultraman-like colossus, Megaloman.

The Story

The planet Rosetta has been taken over by the Black Star army led by Captain Dagger. Takashi Shishido and his mother Rosemary escaped to Planet Earth after his father Gou was captured by Dagger, who is actually Takashi's evil twin brother Hiroshi! While living peacefully on Earth, Takashi attends a kung-fu school in Japan, and has four friends, but they had no idea that he was from another planet, a secret only his martial arts teacher Takamine knew. But when Captain Dagger initiates his attack on Earth using his army of various giant monsters, Rosemary (who also goes by the civilian name "Mari") gives Takashi the Megalon-Bracelets, with which he can transform into the giant long-haired warrior Megaloman to fight the evil monsters for the protection of Earth. Early in the show, Takashi's four martial arts school friends, Seiji Kurogawa (a tough, Bruce Lee-like fighter), Hyosuke Yuri (the comedy relief), Ran Takamine (Master Takamine's daughter & Takashi's girlfriend) and Ippei Saru (the little kid) discover his secret and Rosemary decides to invite them to join Takashi in battle. So she gives them their own Megalon Bracelets to transform into a quartet of multicolored martial arts super-warriors to fight alongside Takashi.

Staff

Original Story: Tetsu Kariya
Planning: Kimio Ikeda
Producers: Kiichi Shitamura, Yoichi Manoda, Yoshio Yamamoto
Music: Seiji Yokoyama (Conductor: Hiroshi Kumagai), Shozo Tozuka (theme songs)
Theme song singer: Ichirou Mizuki
Lighting: Kunio Kishida
Photography: Kazumasa Nomura, Yoshihiro Mori
Art Director: Akihiko Takahashi
Martial Arts Choreography: Junji Yamaoka (Japan Action Club)
Special Effects: Koichi Kawakita, Yoichi Manoda

Cast

Takashi Shishido/Megaloman/Captain Dagger: Yuki Kitazume
Ran Takamine: Madoka Sugi
Hyousuke Yuri: Pepe Hozumi
Seiji Kurogawa: Jimmy Araki
Ippei Mashira: Koji Hashimichi
Rosemary/Mari Shishido: Yukiko Takabayashi
Sougen Takamine Yoshio Inoue
Berlock: Susumu Kurobe

Episode

 The Fiery Superman Strikes
 The Bracelets of Friendship
 The Shout of the Space Team
 Appearance of the Magnetic Monster
 The Star of Mt Hoshimigoka
 Order: Operation Invasion
 Fighting the Warrior of Love
 On Guard, Small Hero
 A UFO and a Dead Soldier in the Sea
 Combat in the Crime Army
 Battle For Command
 The Great Challenge
 The Battle of the Monsters
 The Earth's Children are Threatened
 Inner Conflict
 The Mask of Gold
 Where is the Secret Base?
 Proof Positive
 The Secret of the Scales
 The Great Invasion of Monsters
 The Heroism of Mary
 The Secret of the Megalo-Fire
 Infernal Prisoner
 Blood Urge
 The Death of Seiji
 The Monster Zagno Zvider
 A Providential Aide
 The Sacrifice of Hyme
 Takeshi - Don't Shoot the Monster!
 Dagger's Counterattack
 The Ultimate Challenge

1979 Japanese television series debuts
1979 Japanese television series endings
Fuji TV original programming
Toho tokusatsu
Tokusatsu television series